Borup, in Køge Municipality, 40 km southwest of Copenhagen, Denmark, is a railway town on the railroad between Roskilde and Ringsted. With a population of 4,728 (1 January 2022), it is the second largest town of the municipality.

Geography
Borup is located in east central Zealand, 14 km west of Køge, 11 km northeast of Ringsted, and 18 km southwest of Roskilde - between the two small lakes Borup Lake (Danish: Borup Sø) on the western outskirts of the town and the larger Kimmerslev Lake (Danish: Kimmerslev Sø) on the southeastern outskirts.

Etymology

BORUP is the evolution and shortening of what would be BYTHORP in English. In other words the place name is based on two words having the meaning of "dwelling place".

History
In 1967, Borup was known for an air-raid shelter built in the town by the doomsday cult The Orthon cult.

On 1 April 1970, Borup became the municipal seat of Skovbo Municipality, until it was merged with Køge Municipality on 1 January 2007.

Notable people 

 Frede Christoffersen (1919 in Borup – 1987) a Danish painter and illustrator
 Jakob Glerup (born 1975 in Borup) a former Danish football midfielder, played 454 games for Viborg FF

References

Cities and towns in Region Zealand
Køge Municipality